Rear Admiral Robert Harris Wyman (12 July 1822 – 2 December 1882) was an officer in the U.S. Navy.

Early career
Robert Harris Wyman was born at Portsmouth, New Hampshire. He was appointed midshipman on 11 March 1837 and served initially in the razee  on the Brazil station. After sea duty in the sloops-of-war  and —the latter commanded by his father—he was appointed passed midshipman in 1843.

Service in the Mexican–American War
Over the next three years, Wyman served in South American waters in the schooner , the brig , and the frigate  before participating in the Mexican–American War in Commodore Conner's Home Squadron—first in the steamer  and later in the brig  and the sloop . During that time, he took part in the expeditions against Tampico during November 1846 and Veracruz in March 1847.

Passed Midshipman, Wyman spent a tour of duty ashore at the Naval Observatory, Washington, D.C., before reporting to the receiving ship  at Boston, Massachusetts, and subsequently being promoted to lieutenant on 16 July 1850.

Service in the American Civil War
That ship, as part of the Potomac River Flotilla, helped to keep open the Union's vital waterway communications with Washington, D.C.,  while cutting off Southern forces from their sympathizers in southern Maryland.

Commanding the steamer  from October 1861, Wyman took part in Flag Officer DuPont's capture of the key seaport of Port Royal, South Carolina. After that operation, Wyman returned north and took command of the Potomac River Flotilla on 6 December 1861. He held this important post until the end of June 1862. During his time in the Potomac, he was active in maintaining Union control of that vital river and of much of the Rappahannock during General McClellan's Peninsular Campaign. His ships destroyed Southern bridges, captured nine Confederate ships, and burned 40 schooners.

Promoted to commander on 16 July 1862, Wyman was ordered to command the gunboat  on the James River. Transferred to the West Indian Squadron the following October, he commanded the steam sloop  and the paddle steamer , and captured the blockade runners  and Lizzie. During the last two years of the Civil War, Wyman served on special duty in the Navy Department in Washington, D.C.

Later career
After the Civil War, Wyman commanded , the flagship for the European Squadron. He was promoted to captain on July 25, 1866, and took command of the steam sloop  the following year.

After that tour of sea duty, Wyman headed the Navy's Hydrographic Office for eight years, receiving promotions to commodore on July 19, 1872, and to rear admiral on April 26, 1878. His leadership of the Hydrographic Office proved to be of great importance to the Navy and seafaring men in general. Through the Civil War, the United States Navy had relied upon foreign sources—principally British—for their navigational charts, doing little of their own hydrographic work. Under Wyman's direction, the office began a systematic and sustained program of worldwide charting and surveying, the precursor of the navy's present globe-girdling oceanographic research effort.

Wyman was given command of the North Atlantic Squadron in January 1879, leaving in on May 25, 1882, to become a member (and later chairman) of the Lighthouse Board.

Rear Admiral Wyman died in Washington, D.C., on December 2, 1882. He was interred at Oak Hill Cemetery in Washington, D.C.

Namesake
The United States Navy ship , launched on 30 October 1969, was named in his honor.

See also

References

External links
 Thomas W. and Robert H. Wyman Naval Papers, 1817-1855 MS 5 held by Special Collections & Archives, Nimitz Library at the United States Naval Academy

1822 births
1882 deaths
Union Navy officers
United States Navy admirals
People of New Hampshire in the American Civil War
People from Portsmouth, New Hampshire
Burials at Oak Hill Cemetery (Washington, D.C.)